James Hardy Ropes (September 3, 1866January 7, 1933) was an American theologian. He graduated from Harvard College in 1889 and was an instructor there from 1895 to 1898 and an assistant professor until 1903.  Ropes was then appointed the Bussey Professor of New Testament criticism.  He occupied the Hollis Chair at Harvard Divinity School starting in 1910.  He was also the Chairman of Commission on Extension Courses and Dean of the University Extension.

He led the funeral of Henry Bradford Endicott, for whom Ropes' boss, Harvard President A. Lawrence Lowell, served as a pall bearer with Governors Calvin Coolidge and Samuel W. McCall.

References

Works cited

External links
 Sermons and glass slides by James Hardy Ropes are in the Harvard Divinity School Library at Harvard Divinity School in Cambridge, Massachusetts.

1866 births
1933 deaths
People from Salem, Massachusetts
Harvard Divinity School faculty
Harvard Extension School faculty
Harvard University administrators
Harvard College alumni
Phillips Academy alumni